Lonban is one of the oldest districts of Isfahan in Iran. This district is famous for Lonban Mosque.

Isfahan